Stathmonotus culebrai, the Panamanian worm blenny, is a species of chaenopsid blenny found in rocky reefs around Costa Rica and Panama, in the eastern central Pacific ocean. It can reach a maximum length of  TL.

References
 Seale, A., 1940 (29 Apr.) Report on fishes from Allan Hancock Expeditions in the California Academy of Sciences. Allan Hancock Pacific Expedition 1932–40, Los Angeles v. 9 (no. 1): 1-46, 1–5.

culebrai
Fish described in 1940